White Polish is an ethnicity classification used in Scotland at the 2011 United Kingdom Census. In the census, the White Polish population was 571,762, 61,201 of which are in Scotland which equates to 1.16% of the total population in Scotland.

In England and Wales, the category is not its own section like Scotland meaning write in answers for "White Polish" are designated under the broader Other White group.

The Scottish Government's policy since 2011, however, has been to include "White Polish" as a specific subgrouping of the 5,084,407 white people recorded in Scotland at the last UK census. Other subgroupings in Scotland's census are "White Scottish", "White Other British", "White Irish", "White Gypsy / Traveller", and "White Other White".

Terminology

Local government, NHS and police
Outside of the national census, many county councils additionally use the "White Polish" category in local statistics, as do Police Scotland, and regional health boards of NHS Scotland. Some of the local governments that use the category include Angus Council and Dundee City Council.

Demographics

Population and distribution
The distribution of people who consider themselves to be White Polish is most concentrated in North East Scotland, with up to 3 percent in Aberdeen at the 2011 census. Edinburgh had around a 3 percent White Polish populace, and Dundee a 1.4 percent, at the latest census. As of June 2015, around 3,000 people who identified with the category resided in Fife, which amounted to 0.8% the county's population.

Despite there being a long history of Polish immigration to Scotland, and therefore Polish ancestry within the country, data from the 2011 census suggests that the Scottish-born White Polish population were overwhelming the children of recent Polish migrants. Analyzed in Scottish Affairs, 80 percent of White Polish infants were under the age of 3, suggesting that Scottish residents with Polish ancestry dating further back (such as the significant migrations of Poles during and after World War II) were most likely identifying as White Scottish.

As the category was introduced in 2011, in statistical research White Polish data is sometimes compared with the category of Other White for pre-2011 analysis.

Economic status and language
In the 2011 census results, at 56 percent; White Polish people were most likely to be working as a full-time employee. The data also showed that people who self-identified as White Polish were most likely to be economically active in Scotland, at rate of 86 percent of the group. In 2020, a Global Health Policy Unit publication identified 35 percent of the grouping as working in "elementary occupations", which linked this to health risks, such as disproportionate exposure to COVID-19.

In 2011, the General Register Office for Scotland found that 1 percent of the population used the Polish language at home exclusively, which was around the same percentage as use of Scots, and twice that of Scottish Gaelic.

Religion
Statistically, White Polish are more likely to be Christian than other religions. According to the 2011 UK Census, 49,537 White Polish (nearly 81%) are Christian in Scotland, the vast majority of which are Roman Catholic (46,963 persons), with smaller representations being Church of Scotland (524 persons), and 2,050 registering as "Other Christian".

Social and health issues

Discrimination
Between 2013 and 2014, Police Scotland data showed that up to 14 percent of victims of racist incidents fell under the category of White Polish. Between April and June 2015, Police Scotland Forth Valley division's statistics (covering Clackmannanshire, Falkirk and Stirling) found that those defined as "White Polish" were the victims in 4.8% of the recorded hate crime-related incidents.

In 2020, the Daily Record reported accounts from former students of racial discrimination directed towards people who identified as, or were perceived to be, White Polish, at St Augustine's R.C. High School in Edinburgh.

Health
Scottish residents in the White Polish category generally reported good health under the age of 65. Both men and women, who listed themselves as White Polish, recorded almost half the rates of ill health than those of men and women identifying as White Scottish. A 2019 Ethnicity & Health analysis also demonstrated better health among the White Polish population compared with White Scottish data.

Between 12 March and 14 June 2020, of the 4,070 recorded COVID-19-involved deaths in Scotland, the White Polish group had one of the lowest shares at less than 0.1%, compared with White Irish at 1.3%, and White Scottish at 88.6%. In May 2020, a University of Edinburgh report associated the group's tendency to "elementary occupations" with risk of exposure to the virus.

Housing
In 2011, people in the category of White Polish were most likely to experience overcrowding in Scottish households.

See also 

 Ethnic groups in the United Kingdom
 Demographics of the United Kingdom
 Demographics of Scotland
 List of United Kingdom censuses
 Classification of ethnicity in the United Kingdom
 National Statistics Socio-economic Classification
 Genetic history of the British Isles
 Historical immigration to Great Britain
 List of English districts and their ethnic composition
 Poles
 Polish people in the United Kingdom

References 

Polish diaspora in the United Kingdom